Aalberts N.V. is a Dutch company and was founded under its former name Aalberts Industries by Jan Aalberts in 1975 and became public in 1987. The company was part of AEX from 2015 to 2020 and is currently listed in the AMX. Biggest shareholders are family Aalberts, FMR, Capital Group, Invesco, BlackRock, Impax Asset Management, BNP Paribas Asset Management, New Perspective Fund.

Aalberts engineers mission-critical technologies enabling a clean, smart and responsible future. Aalberts has over 14,402 employees, 135 locations with activities in over 50 countries and operates four mission-critical technology clusters in four end markets: eco-friendly buildings, semiconductor efficiency, sustainable transportation and industrial niches.

Acquisitions & Mergers   
 Hage Fittings & Flanschen GmbH (2003) Stainless Steel Pressfittings Starpress & GRPESS and Valve Manufacturer
 H&ST Heat & Surface (2002) 
 Metalis and Methatherm (2002)
 Durotec (2002) Fluid Control Distributor 
 Machinefabriek Van Andel (2002)
 Härterei Hauck Rhein-Main GmbH (2002) increased stake 60% to 90% 
 Acorn (2002) Surface Treatment 
 Standard Hidráulica S.A. (2001) Flow Control Manufacturer 
 Meibes Zeitspar-Armaturen (2001) Stainless Steel Valves
 PBC Dopheide (2001) Industrial Coating 
 AHC Group (2001) Industiral Coatings
 Van Roij Engineering (2000) Steel Distributor
 Stork TPP (2000) High-Precision Componentry 
 Tratmar (2000) 
 Thermi (2000) Heat Treatment and Coating Center

References

External links

 
 Bloomberg

Companies based in Utrecht (province)
Multinational companies headquartered in the Netherlands
Manufacturing companies established in 1975
Dutch brands
Companies listed on Euronext Amsterdam
1975 establishments in the Netherlands